Alonso Suárez de la Fuente del Sauce (died 1520) was a Roman Catholic prelate who served as Bishop of Jaén (1500–1520), Bishop of Lugo (1496–1500), and Bishop of Mondoñedo (1493–1496).

Biography
In 1493, Alonso Suárez de la Fuente del Sauce was appointed during the papacy of Pope Alexander VI as Bishop of Mondoñedo. In 1496, he was appointed during the papacy of Pope Alexander VI as Bishop of Lugo. In 1500, he was appointed during the papacy of Pope Alexander VI as Bishop of Jaén. He served as Bishop of Jaén until his death in 1520.

References

External links and additional sources
 (for Chronology of Bishops) 
 (for Chronology of Bishops) 
 (for Chronology of Bishops) 
 (for Chronology of Bishops) 
 (for Chronology of Bishops) 
 (for Chronology of Bishops) 

15th-century Roman Catholic bishops in Castile
16th-century Roman Catholic bishops in Spain
Bishops appointed by Pope Alexander VI
1520 deaths